Lieutenant-General Robert Skene  (1719–1787) was a British Army officer and politician who sat in the House of Commons between1779 and 1787.

Early life
Skene was the eldest son of David Skene of Pitlour or Hallyards, and his wife Jean Douglas, daughter of John Douglas of Strathendry, Fife. He was a cousin of Adam Smith.

Army career
Skene joined the army and was an ensign in the 19th Foot in 1743 and lieutenant in 1745. He succeeded to his father’s estates in 1747. In 1756 he became a captain in a newly formed regiment, the 59th Foot. He was  lieutenant-colonel and deputy adjutant-general for North Britain in 1758 and adjutant general in 1763. From 1767 to 1789 he was inspector of roads in the Highlands. He became Colonel in 1772, Major-general in 1777 and Lieutenant-general in 1782. He was also Colonel of the short lived  99th Foot (Jamaica) from 1781 to 1783 and Colonel of the 48th Foot from 1783 to his death.

Political career
Skene was intending to stand for Parliament at Fife at a by-election on 2 July 1776, supported by John Campbell, 5th Duke of Argyll, but gave his interest to James Townsend Oswald against John Henderson.  When Oswald resigned in 1779 Skene was returned as Member of Parliament at a by-election on 2 July 1779. However Henderson petitioned that he was disqualified by his office of inspector of roads and he was unseated on 7 February 1780. Skene was returned for Fife unopposed at the 1780 general election. He supported North’s Administration until its fall. He was re-elected in a contest at the 1784 general election in spite of opposition from Henderson and the Dundas interest. He continued to vote against the Government until his death. In Parliament he was considered an authority on road bills, but he is not known to have made a speech in Parliament.

Skene died unmarried on 19 May 1787.

References

1719 births
1787 deaths
British Army generals
British MPs 1774–1780
British MPs 1780–1784
British MPs 1784–1790
Members of the Parliament of Great Britain for Scottish constituencies
Green Howards officers
59th Regiment of Foot officers
48th Regiment of Foot officers